Julia Sakala (born 12 July 1969) is a retired Zimbabwean middle-distance runner.Julia Sakala used to run for textile manufacturing Company David Whitehead in Chegutu.She has won a lot of Gold medals in the early 1980s to late 1990s. She represented Zimbabwe mainly in the 800m winning bronze at the 1995 All africa games.

International competitions

External links
 

1969 births
Living people
Zimbabwean female middle-distance runners
Zimbabwean female long-distance runners
Athletes (track and field) at the 2000 Summer Olympics
Athletes (track and field) at the 1994 Commonwealth Games
Athletes (track and field) at the 1998 Commonwealth Games
Olympic athletes of Zimbabwe
Commonwealth Games bronze medallists for Zimbabwe
Commonwealth Games medallists in athletics
African Games silver medalists for Zimbabwe
African Games medalists in athletics (track and field)
Athletes (track and field) at the 1995 All-Africa Games
Athletes (track and field) at the 1999 All-Africa Games
Medallists at the 1998 Commonwealth Games